Rolf Ludwig (28 July 1925 – 27 March 1999) was a German actor. He appeared in more than one hundred films from 1952 to 1997.

Selected filmography

References

External links 

1925 births
1999 deaths
Male actors from Stockholm
German male film actors